The Cromwellian conquest of Ireland or Cromwellian war in Ireland (1649–1653) was the re-conquest of Ireland by the forces of the English Parliament, led by Oliver Cromwell, during the Wars of the Three Kingdoms. Cromwell invaded Ireland with the New Model Army on behalf of England's Rump Parliament in August 1649.

Following the Irish Rebellion of 1641, most of Ireland came under the control of the Irish Catholic Confederation. In early 1649, the Confederates allied with the English Royalists, who had been defeated by the Parliamentarians in the English Civil War. By May 1652, Cromwell's Parliamentarian army had defeated the Confederate and Royalist coalition in Ireland and occupied the country, ending the Irish Confederate Wars (or Eleven Years' War). However, guerrilla warfare continued for a further year. Cromwell passed a series of Penal Laws against Roman Catholics (the vast majority of the population) and confiscated large amounts of their land.  As punishment for the rebellion of 1641, almost all lands owned by Irish Catholics were confiscated and given to British settlers. The remaining Catholic landowners were transplanted to Connacht. The Act of Settlement 1652 formalised the change in land ownership.  Catholics were barred from the Irish Parliament altogether, forbidden to live in towns and from marrying Protestants.

The Parliamentarian conquest was brutal, and Cromwell remains a deeply reviled figure in Ireland. The extent to which Cromwell, who was in direct command for the first year of the campaign, was responsible for the atrocities is debated to this day. Some historians have argued that the actions of Cromwell were within what many empires at the time viewed as accepted rules of war, while others disagree.

The impact of the war on the Irish population was unquestionably severe and although there is no consensus as to the magnitude of the loss of life, most modern estimates generally fall in between 15 and 50% of the native population. The war resulted in famine, which was worsened by an outbreak of bubonic plague. Older estimates of the drop in the Irish population resulting from the Parliamentarian campaign reach as high as 83 percent. The Parliamentarians also transported about 50,000 people as indentured labourers to the English colonies in North America and Caribbean. Some estimates cover population losses over the course of the Conquest Period (1649–52) only, while others cover the period of the Conquest to 1653 and the period of the Cromwellian Settlement from August 1652 to 1659 together.

Background
The English Rump Parliament, victorious in the English Civil War, and having executed King Charles in January 1649, had several reasons for sending the New Model Army to Ireland in 1649.

The first and most pressing reason was an alliance signed in 1649 between the Irish Confederate Catholics, Charles II, proclaimed King of Ireland in January 1649, and the English Royalists. This allowed for Royalist troops to be sent to Ireland and put the Irish Confederate Catholic troops under the command of Royalist officers led by James Butler, Earl of Ormonde. Their aim was to invade England and restore the monarchy there. This was a threat which the new English Commonwealth could not afford to ignore.

Secondly, Parliament also had a longstanding commitment to re-conquer Ireland dating back to the Irish Rebellion of 1641. Even if the Irish Confederates had not allied themselves with the Royalists, it is likely that the English Parliament would have eventually tried to invade the country to crush Catholic power there. They had sent Parliamentary forces to Ireland throughout the Wars of the Three Kingdoms (most of them under Michael Jones in 1647). They viewed Ireland as part of the territory governed by right by the Kingdom of England and only temporarily out of its control since the Rebellion of 1641. Many Parliamentarians wished to punish the Irish for atrocities against the mainly Scottish Protestant settlers during the 1641 Uprising. Furthermore, some Irish towns (notably Wexford and Waterford) had acted as bases from which privateers had attacked English shipping throughout the 1640s.

In addition, the English Parliament had a financial imperative to invade Ireland to confiscate land there in order to repay its creditors. The Parliament had raised loans of £10 million under the Adventurers Act to subdue Ireland since 1642, on the basis that its creditors would be repaid with land confiscated from Irish Catholic rebels. To repay these loans, it would be necessary to conquer Ireland and confiscate such land. The Parliamentarians also had internal political reasons to send forces to Ireland. Army mutinies at Banbury and Bishopsgate in April and May 1649 were unsettling the New Model Army, and the soldiers' demands would probably increase if they were left idle.

Finally, for some Parliamentarians, the war in Ireland was a religious war. Cromwell and much of his army were Puritans who considered all Roman Catholics to be heretics, and so for them the conquest was partly a crusade. The Irish Confederates had been supplied with arms and money by the Papacy and had welcomed the papal legate Pierfrancesco Scarampi and later the Papal Nuncio Giovanni Battista Rinuccini in 1643–49.

Battle of Rathmines and Cromwell's landing in Ireland

By the end of the period, known as Confederate Ireland, in 1649 the only remaining Parliamentarian outpost in Ireland was in Dublin, under the command of Colonel Jones. A combined Royalist and Confederate force under the Marquess of Ormonde gathered at Rathmines, south of Dublin, to take the city and deprive the Parliamentarians of a port in which they could land. Jones, however, launched a surprise attack on the Royalists while they were deploying on 2 August, putting them to flight. Jones claimed to have killed around 4,000 Royalist or Confederate soldiers and taken 2,517 prisoners.

Oliver Cromwell called the battle "an astonishing mercy, so great and seasonable that we are like them that dreamed", as it meant that he had a secure port at which he could land his army in Ireland, and that he retained the capital city. With Admiral Robert Blake blockading the remaining Royalist fleet under Prince Rupert of the Rhine in Kinsale, Cromwell landed on 15 August with thirty-five ships filled with troops and equipment. Henry Ireton landed two days later with a further seventy-seven ships.

Ormonde's troops retreated from around Dublin in disarray. They were badly demoralised by their unexpected defeat at Rathmines and were incapable of fighting another pitched battle in the short term. As a result, Ormonde hoped to hold the walled towns on Ireland's east coast to hold up the Cromwellian advance until the winter, when he hoped that "Colonel Hunger and Major Sickness" (i.e. hunger and disease) would deplete their ranks.

Siege of Drogheda

Upon landing, Cromwell proceeded to take the other port cities on Ireland's east coast, to facilitate the efficient landing of supplies and reinforcements from England. The first town to fall was Drogheda, about 50 km north of Dublin. Drogheda was garrisoned by a regiment of 3,000 English Royalist and Irish Confederate soldiers, commanded by Arthur Aston. After a week-long siege, Cromwell's forces breached the walls protecting the town. Aston refused Cromwell's request that he surrender. In the ensuing battle for the town, Cromwell ordered that no quarter be given, and the majority of the garrison and Catholic priests were killed. Many civilians also died in the sack. Aston was beaten to death by the Roundheads with his own wooden leg.

The massacre of the garrison in Drogheda, including some after they had surrendered and some who had sheltered in a church, was received with horror in Ireland and is used today as an example of Cromwell's extreme cruelty.
Having taken Drogheda, Cromwell took most of his army south to secure the southeastern ports. He sent a detachment of 5,000 men north under Robert Venables to take eastern Ulster from the remnants of a Scottish Covenanter army that had landed there in 1642. They defeated the Scots at the Battle of Lisnagarvey (6 December 1649) and linked up with a Parliamentarian army composed of English settlers based around Derry in western Ulster, which was commanded by Charles Coote.

Wexford, Waterford and Duncannon

The New Model Army then marched south to secure the ports of Wexford, Waterford and Duncannon. Wexford was the scene of another infamous atrocity: the Sack of Wexford, when Parliamentarian troops broke into the town while negotiations for its surrender were ongoing, and sacked it, killing about 2,000 soldiers and 1,500 townspeople and burning much of the town. Cromwell's responsibility for the sack of Wexford is disputed. He did not order the attack on the town, and had been in the process of negotiating its surrender when his troops broke into the town. On the other hand, his critics point out that he made little effort to restrain his troops or to punish them afterwards for their conduct.

Arguably, the sack of Wexford was somewhat counter-productive for the Parliamentarians. The destruction of the town meant that the Parliamentarians could not use its port as a base for supplying their forces in Ireland. Secondly, the effects of the severe measures adopted at Drogheda and at Wexford were mixed. To some degree they may have been intended to discourage further resistance. The Gaelic Irish majority saw such towns as culturally English; seeing the Anglo-Irish being punished so harshly, the rural Gaelic Irish might expect even worse unless they complied with the invaders.

The Royalist commander Ormonde thought that the terror of Cromwell's army had a paralysing effect on his forces. Towns like New Ross and Carlow subsequently surrendered on terms when besieged by Cromwell's forces. On the other hand, the massacres of the defenders of Drogheda and Wexford prolonged resistance elsewhere, as they convinced many Irish Catholics that they would be killed even if they surrendered.

Such towns as Waterford, Duncannon, Clonmel, Limerick and Galway only surrendered after determined resistance. Cromwell was unable to take Waterford or Duncannon and the New Model Army had to retire to winter quarters, where many of its men died of disease, especially typhoid and dysentery. The port city of Waterford and Duncannon town eventually surrendered after prolonged sieges in 1650.

Clonmel and the conquest of Munster

The following spring, Cromwell mopped up the remaining walled towns in Ireland's southeast—notably the Confederate capital of Kilkenny, which surrendered on terms: see Siege of Kilkenny. The New Model Army met its only serious reverse in Ireland at the Siege of Clonmel, where its attacks on the town's defences were repulsed at a cost of up to 2,000 men. The town nevertheless surrendered the following day.

Cromwell's treatment of Kilkenny and Clonmel is in contrast to that of Drogheda and Wexford. Despite the fact that his troops had suffered heavy casualties attacking the former two, Cromwell respected surrender terms which guaranteed the lives and property of the townspeople and the evacuation of armed Irish troops who were defending them. The change in attitude on the part of the Parliamentarian commander may have been a recognition that excessive cruelty was prolonging Irish resistance. However, in the case of Drogheda and Wexford no surrender agreement had been negotiated, and by the rules of continental siege warfare prevalent in the mid-17th century, this meant no quarter would be given; thus it can be argued that Cromwell's attitude had not changed.

Ormonde's Royalists still held most of Munster, but were outflanked by a mutiny of their own garrison in Cork. The British Protestant troops there had been fighting for the Parliament up to 1648 and resented fighting with the Confederates. Their mutiny handed Cork and most of Munster to Cromwell and they defeated the local Irish garrison at the Battle of Macroom. The Irish and Royalist forces retreated behind the River Shannon into Connacht or (in the case of the remaining Munster forces) into the fastness of County Kerry.

Collapse of the Royalist alliance
In May 1650, Charles II repudiated his father's (Charles I's) alliance with the Irish Confederates in preference for an alliance with the Scottish Covenanters (see Treaty of Breda). This totally undermined Ormonde's position as head of a Royalist coalition in Ireland. Cromwell published generous surrender terms for Protestant Royalists in Ireland and many of them either capitulated or went over to the Parliamentarian side.

This left in the field only the remaining Irish Catholic armies and a few diehard English Royalists. From this point onwards, many Irish Catholics, including their bishops and clergy, questioned why they should accept Ormonde's leadership when his master, the King, had repudiated his alliance with them. Cromwell left Ireland in May 1650 to fight the Third English Civil War against the new Scottish–Royalist alliance. He passed his command onto Henry Ireton.

Scarrifholis and the destruction of the Ulster Army

The most formidable force left to the Irish and Royalists was the 6,000 strong army of Ulster, formerly commanded by Owen Roe O'Neill, who died in 1649. However the army was now commanded by an inexperienced Catholic bishop named Heber MacMahon. The Ulster Army met a Parliamentarian army, composed mainly of British settlers and commanded by Charles Coote, at the Battle of Scarrifholis in County Donegal in June 1650. The Ulster army was routed and as many as 2,000 of its men were killed. In addition, MacMahon and most of the Ulster Army's officers were either killed at the battle or captured and executed after it. This eliminated the last strong field army opposing the Parliamentarians in Ireland and secured for them the northern province of Ulster. Coote's army, despite suffering heavy losses at the Siege of Charlemont, the last Catholic stronghold in the north, was now free to march south and invade the west coast of Ireland.

Sieges of Limerick and Galway

The Parliamentarians crossed the River Shannon into the western province of Connacht in October 1650. An Irish army under Clanricarde had attempted to stop them but this was surprised and routed at the Battle of Meelick Island. Ormonde was discredited by the constant stream of defeats for the Irish and Royalist forces and no longer had the confidence of the men he commanded, particularly the Irish Confederates. He fled for France in December 1650 and was replaced by an Irish nobleman Ulick Burke of Clanricarde as commander. The Irish and Royalist forces were penned into the area west of the River Shannon and placed their last hope on defending the strongly walled cities of Limerick and Galway on Ireland's west coast. These cities had built extensive modern defences and could not be taken by a straightforward assault as at Drogheda or Wexford. Ireton besieged Limerick while Charles Coote surrounded Galway, but they were unable to take the strongly fortified cities and instead blockaded them until a combination of hunger and disease forced them to surrender. An Irish force from Kerry attempted to relieve Limerick from the south, but was intercepted and routed at the Battle of Knocknaclashy. Limerick fell in 1651 and Galway the following year. Disease however killed indiscriminately and Ireton, along with thousands of Parliamentarian troops, died of plague outside Limerick in 1651.

Guerrilla warfare, famine and plague

The fall of Galway saw the end of organised resistance to the Cromwellian conquest, but fighting continued as small units of Irish troops launched guerrilla attacks on the Parliamentarians.

The guerrilla phase of the war had been going since late 1650 and at the end of 1651, despite the defeat of the main Irish or Royalist forces, there were still estimated to be 30,000 men in arms against the Parliamentarians. Tories (from the Irish word tóraí meaning "pursuer" or "outlaw") operated from difficult terrain such as the Bog of Allen, the Wicklow Mountains and the drumlin country in the north midlands, and within months made the countryside extremely dangerous for all except large parties of Parliamentarian troops. Ireton mounted a punitive expedition to the Wicklow mountains in 1650 to try to put down the tories there, but without success.

By early 1651, it was reported that no English supply convoys were safe if they travelled more than two miles outside a military base. In response, the Parliamentarians destroyed food supplies and forcibly evicted civilians who were thought to be helping the Tories. John Hewson systematically destroyed food stocks in counties Wicklow and County Kildare, Hardress Waller did likewise in the Burren in County Clare, as did Colonel Cook in County Wexford. The result was famine throughout much of Ireland, aggravated by an outbreak of bubonic plague. As the guerrilla war ground on, the Parliamentarians, as of April 1651, designated areas such as County Wicklow and much of the south of the country as what would now be called free-fire zones, where anyone found would be, "taken slain and destroyed as enemies and their cattle and good shall be taken or spoiled as the goods of enemies". This tactic had succeeded in the Nine Years' War.

This phase of the war was by far the most costly in terms of civilian loss of life. The combination of warfare, famine and plague caused a huge mortality among the Irish population. William Petty estimated (in the 1655–56 Down Survey) that the death toll of the wars in Ireland since 1641 was over 618,000 people, or about 40% of the country's pre-war population. Of these, he estimated that over 400,000 were Catholics, 167,000 killed directly by war or famine, and the remainder by war-related disease. Modern estimates put the toll at closer to 20%.

In addition, some fifty thousand Irish people, including prisoners of war, were sold as indentured servants under the English Commonwealth regime. They were often sent to the English colonies in North America and the Caribbean where they subsequently comprised a substantial portion of certain Caribbean colony populations in the late 17th century. In Barbados, some of their descendants are known as Redlegs.

Eventually, the guerrilla war was ended when the Parliamentarians published surrender terms in 1652 allowing Irish troops to go abroad to serve in foreign armies not at war with the Commonwealth of England. Most went to France or Spain. The largest Irish guerrilla forces under John Fitzpatrick (in Leinster, Edmund O'Dwyer (in Munster) and Edmund Daly (in Connacht) surrendered in 1652, under terms signed at Kilkenny in May of that year. However, up to 11,000 men, mostly in Ulster, were still thought to be in the field at the end of the year. The last Irish and Royalist forces (the remnants of the Confederate's Ulster Army, led by Philip O'Reilly) formally surrendered at Cloughoughter in County Cavan on 27 April 1653. However, low-level guerrilla warfare continued for the remainder of the decade and was accompanied by widespread lawlessness. Undoubtedly some of the tories were simple brigands, whereas others were politically motivated. The Cromwellians distinguished in their rewards for information or capture of outlaws between "private tories" and "public tories".

The Cromwellian Settlement

Cromwell imposed an extremely harsh settlement on the Irish Catholic population. This was because of his deep religious antipathy to the Catholic religion and to punish Irish Catholics for the rebellion of 1641, in particular the massacres of Protestant settlers in Ulster. Also he needed to raise money to pay off his army and to repay the London merchants who had subsidised the war under the Adventurers Act back in 1640.

Anyone implicated in the rebellion of 1641 was executed. Those who participated in Confederate Ireland had all their land confiscated and thousands were transported to the West Indies as indentured labourers. Those Catholic landowners who had not taken part in the wars still had their land confiscated, although they were entitled to claim land in Connacht as compensation. In addition, no Catholics were allowed to live in towns. Irish soldiers who had fought in the Confederate and Royalist armies left the country in large numbers to find service in the armies of France and Spain—William Petty estimated their number at 54,000 men. The practice of Catholicism was banned and bounties were offered for the capture of priests, who were executed when found.

The Long Parliament had passed the Adventurers Act in 1640 (the act received royal assent in 1642), under which those who lent money to Parliament for the subjugation of Ireland would be paid in confiscated land in Ireland. In addition, Parliamentarian soldiers who served in Ireland were entitled to an allotment of confiscated land there, in lieu of their wages, which the Parliament was unable to pay in full. As a result, many thousands of New Model Army veterans were settled in Ireland. Moreover, the pre-war Protestant settlers greatly increased their ownership of land (see also: The Cromwellian Plantation).  Before the wars, Irish Catholics had owned 60% of the land in Ireland, whereas by the time of the Stuart Restoration, when compensations had been made to Catholic Royalists, they owned only 20% of it. During the Commonwealth period, Catholic landownership had fallen to 8%. Even after the Restoration of 1660, Catholics were barred from all public office, but not from the Irish Parliament.

Historical debate
The Parliamentarian campaign in Ireland was the most ruthless of the Civil War period. In particular, Cromwell's actions at Drogheda and Wexford earned him a reputation for cruelty.

Cromwell's critics point to his response to a plea by Catholic Bishops to the Irish Catholic people to resist him in which he states that although his intention was not to "massacre, banish and destroy the Catholic inhabitants", if they did resist "I hope to be free from the misery and desolation, blood and ruin that shall befall them, and shall rejoice to exercise the utmost severity against them".

Tom Reilly in Cromwell, an Honourable Enemy (Dingle 1999), argues that what happened at Drogheda was not unusually severe by the standards of 17th century siege warfare. In Cromwell was Framed (2014), he claims that civilians were not targeted.
It has also recently been argued, by Tom Reilly in Cromwell, an Honourable Enemy, that what happened at Drogheda and Wexford was not unusually severe by the standards of 17th century siege warfare, in which the garrisons of towns taken by storm were routinely killed to discourage resistance in the future. John Morrill commented, "A major attempt at rehabilitation was attempted by Tom Reilly, Cromwell: An Honourable Enemy (London, 1999) but this has been largely rejected by other scholars." Morrill himself argued, that what happened at Drogheda, "was without straightforward parallel in 17th century British or Irish history... So the Drogheda massacre does stand out for its mercilessness, for its combination of ruthlessness and calculation, for its combination of hot- and cold-bloodiness". Moreover, historians critical of Cromwell point out that at the time the killings at Drogheda and Wexford were considered atrocities. They cite such sources as Edmund Ludlow, the Parliamentarian commander in Ireland after Ireton's death, who wrote that the tactics used by Cromwell at Drogheda showed "extraordinary severity".

Cromwell's actions in Ireland occurred in the context of a mutually cruel war. In 1641–42 Irish insurgents in Ulster killed some 4,000 Protestant settlers who had settled on land confiscated from their former Catholic owners. These events were magnified in Protestant propaganda as an attempt by Irish Catholics to exterminate the English Protestant settlers in Ireland, with English Parliamentarian pamphlets claiming that over 200,000 Protestants had died. In turn, this was used as justification by English Parliamentary and Scottish Covenant forces to take vengeance on the Irish Catholic population. A Parliamentary tract of 1655 argued that, "the whole Irish nation, consisting of gentry, clergy and commonality are engaged as one nation in this quarrel, to root out and extirpate all English Protestants from amongst them".

Atrocities were subsequently committed by all sides. When Murrough O'Brien, the Earl of Inchiquin and Parliamentarian commander in Cork, took Cashel in 1647, he slaughtered the garrison and Catholic clergy there (including Theobald Stapleton), earning the nickname "Murrough of the Burnings". Inchiquin switched allegiances in 1648, becoming a commander of the Royalist forces. After such battles as Dungans Hill and Scarrifholis, English Parliamentarian forces executed thousands of their Irish Catholic prisoners. Similarly, when the Confederate Catholic general Thomas Preston took Maynooth in 1647, he hanged its Catholic defenders as apostates.

Seen in this light, some have argued that the severe conduct of the Parliamentarian campaign of 1649–53 appears unexceptional.

Nevertheless, the 1649–53 campaign remains notorious in Irish popular memory as it was responsible for a huge death toll among the Irish population. The main reason for this was the counter-guerrilla tactics used by such commanders as Henry Ireton, John Hewson and Edmund Ludlow against the Catholic population from 1650, when large areas of the country still resisted the Parliamentary Army. These tactics included the wholesale burning of crops, forced population movement, and killing of civilians.

Total excess deaths for the entire period of the Wars of the Three Kingdoms in Ireland was estimated by Sir William Petty, the 17th century economist, to be 600,000 out of a total Irish population of 1,400,000 in 1641. One modern estimate estimated that at least 200,000 were killed out of a population of allegedly 2 million.

In addition, the whole post-war Cromwellian settlement of Ireland has been characterised by historians such as Mark Levene and Alan Axelrod as ethnic cleansing, in that it sought to remove Irish Catholics from the eastern part of the country, others such as the historical writer Tim Pat Coogan have described the actions of Cromwell and his subordinates as genocide. The aftermath of the Cromwellian campaign and settlement saw extensive dispossession of landowners who were Catholic, and a huge drop in population. In the event, the much larger number of surviving poorer Catholics were not moved westwards; most of them had to fend for themselves by working for the new landowners.

Long-term results
The Cromwellian conquest completed the British colonisation of Ireland, which was merged into the Commonwealth of England, Scotland and Ireland in 1653–59. It destroyed the native Irish Catholic land-owning classes and replaced them with colonists with a British identity. The bitterness caused by the Cromwellian settlement was a powerful source of Irish nationalism from the 17th century onwards.

After the Stuart Restoration in 1660, Charles II of England restored about a third of the confiscated land to the former landlords in the Act of Settlement 1662, but not all, as he needed political support from former parliamentarians in England. A generation later, during the Glorious Revolution, many of the Irish Catholic landed class tried to reverse the remaining Cromwellian settlement in the Williamite War in Ireland (1689–91), where they fought en masse for the Jacobites. They were defeated once again, and many lost land that had been regranted after 1662. As a result, Irish and English Catholics did not become full political citizens of the British state again until 1829 and were legally barred from buying valuable interests in land until the Papists Act 1778.

The Cromwellian government also contributed to the decline and eventual extinction of wolves in Ireland, through such methods as deforestation and anti-wolf legislation, the latter including bounties paid out for killing wolves.

See also
 British military history
 Chronology of the Wars of the Three Kingdoms
 History of Ireland (1536–1691)
 Irish Confederate Wars
 Wars of the Three Kingdoms

Notes

References

Bibliography
Coyle Eugene, of Cromwell: An Honourable Enemy, by Tom Reilly, Brandon Press, 1999,  

Fraser, Antonia. Cromwell Our Chief of Men, Panther, St Albans 1975, 
Ó Siochrú, Mícheál. RTÉ ONE, Cromwell in Ireland Part 2. Broadcast 16 September 2008.

 

Lenihan, Padraig, Confederate Catholics at War, Cork 2001. 
Morrill, John. Rewriting Cromwell: A Case of Deafening Silences. Canadian Journal of History. Dec 2003.
Reilly, Tom. Cromwell, an Honourable Enemy, Dingle 1999, 
Scott-Wheeler, James, Cromwell in Ireland, Dublin 1999,

Further reading

Canny, Nicholas P. Making Ireland British 1580–1650, Oxford 2001, 
Gentles, Ian. The New Model Army, Cambridge 1994, 
O'Siochru, Micheal, God's Executioner- Oliver Cromwell and the Conquest of Ireland, Faber & Faber, London, 2008.
Plant, David. Cromwell in Ireland: 1649–52, British Civil Wars, Retrieved 22 September 2008
Stradling, R.A. The Spanish monarchy and Irish mercenaries, Irish Academic Press, Dublin 1994.
 Excerpts, support for and a critique of Tom Reilly's Cromwell, an Honourable Enemy (1999)

1640s in Ireland
1650s in Ireland
English Civil War
Invasions of Ireland
Wars of the Three Kingdoms
Irish Confederate Wars
Guerrilla wars
Wars involving Ireland
Anti-Catholicism in Ireland
Oliver Cromwell
England–Ireland relations
Genocides in Europe